Jeffrey A. Helfrich (born 1968) is a Republican member of the Oregon House of Representatives. He represents the 52nd district, which covers all of Hood River County and parts of Clackamas and Multnomah counties.

Biography
Helfrich served as an airman in the United States Air Force during Operation Desert Shield and Operation Desert Storm. He then was a sergeant with the Portland Police Bureau for 25 years.

Helfrich served on the Cascade Locks City Council from his appointment in 2011 until November 2012. He was again appointed in February 2013 and served until June 2015, when he resigned and moved to Hood River.

On November 6, 2017, incumbent Representative Mark Johnson resigned. Helfrich was appointed by a unanimous vote of Clackamas, Hood River, and Multnomah county commissioners to serve the remainder of his term. Helfrich ran for a full two-year term in 2018, but was defeated by Democrat Anna Williams. In February 2020, Helfrich filed with the Oregon Secretary of State to enter the Republican primary for District 52 in the 2020 election. Helfrich won the primary and advanced to a rematch with Williams for his old seat.

References

External links
 Campaign website
Facebook page

1960s births
Living people
21st-century American politicians
United States Air Force personnel of the Gulf War
Republican Party members of the Oregon House of Representatives
Oregon city council members
People from Hood River, Oregon
Portland Police Bureau officers
United States Air Force airmen
People from Hood River County, Oregon